Today at Wimbledon is a BBC TV show, showing highlights and discussion from the day's play at the Wimbledon Championships currently hosted by Clare Balding. The show lasts for 60 minutes and is broadcast on BBC Two at 8:30 pm.

Origins
The BBC (the UK host broadcaster of the Championships) began broadcasting Wimbledon in 1937. David Coleman hosted the live coverage from 1964 to 1966 and from 1968 to 1969. Harry Carpenter hosted the live coverage in 1967 and from 1970 to 1990 (and in some years also hosted the evening highlights programme). Des Lynam fronted Wimbledon live coverage on BBC television from 1991 to 1997 and in 1999 (Steve Rider hosted the live coverage in 1998). After Wimbledon 1999, Lynam moved to ITV and was replaced from 2000 by Sue Barker who hosted Wimbledon live coverage on BBC television until 2022.

Broadcast history
The evening highlights programme was initially broadcast late evening on BBC2 when the channel launched in 1964 and titled Wimbledon: Match of the Day. It moved to BBC1 in 1984, in the era when Des Lynam hosted with Gerald Williams as a studio guest. It was renamed Today at Wimbledon in 1990 and moved back to BBC2 in 1997 when it was allotted a fixed start time of 9.30 pm before moving again to an 8:30 pm slot in 2005 and the following year to an even earlier start time of 8.00 pm in 2006 as BBC2 schedules non-sports output between 9 pm and 10.30 pm. As a result, if significant matches last beyond that time the programme is usually cut short (and occasionally not shown at all) to allow the live tennis coverage to be shown, which attract regular viewers.

The show is presented either from the BBC's dedicated studio in the Wimbledon media centre, or from the landscaped garden on the building's roof, adjacent to court 18.

The theme music is from "Sporting Occasion" by Leslie Statham.

Hosts

Wimbledon 2day
In 2015, the programme was rebranded Wimbledon 2day (a pun on the channel's name). Clare Balding became the new presenter after long-time host John Inverdale left to join the BBC's Wimbledon commentary team. The opening week was presented from The Gatsby Club – a temporary hospitality venue outside the grounds – with stand-up presentation, handheld cameras, various social media features and a small live audience. The changes prompted many complaints, in particular the reduction in highlights. The BBC tweaked the format in the second week, Balding hosting a more traditional show, without an audience, from the upper floor of Centre Court with views across the grounds.

For 2016, the show returned to the Today at Wimbledon name and format.

References

External links
 

1964 British television series debuts
1960s British sports television series
1970s British sports television series
1980s British sports television series
1990s British sports television series
2000s British sports television series
2010s British sports television series
2020s British sports television series
BBC Sport
Wimbledon Championships
Tennis on television